Eddie Perez may refer to:

 Eddie Perez (stunt coordinator), director, stunt coordinator and actor
 Eddie Perez (politician) (born 1957), former mayor of Hartford, Connecticut
 Eddie Pérez (baseball) (born 1968), former Major League Baseball catcher
 Eduardo Pérez (born 1969), former Major League Baseball first baseman
 Eddie Perez (guitarist) (born 1968), guitarist of the country band The Mavericks